"Zaman" "(The Past)" is the lead single from Amal Hijazi's 2002 album Zaman, widely considered as her signature song. The single up till that time was considered to be Hijazi's best known and most popular song, and went on number one in a number of countries like Lebanon, Syria, Jordan, Egypt, Algeria and Morocco. "Zaman" is one of the most recognisable and successful songs of the early 2000s and has been considered to be an international hit.

The song also played a significant role in increasing the sales of the album Zaman and by the end of the year, Zaman had become one of the biggest hits of the year, breaking records and sales figures around the world. In addition "Zaman" received much acclaim from critics and the industry. It was in fact the success of the single and the album that Hijazi sign a contract with Panasonic, this becoming their official brand ambassador.

The music video of "Zaman" was one of the highest played and most expensive of 2002. It was directed by Ahmed el Mahdi who portrays Hijazi as a young woman thinking of the time she had had with her lover. At the beginning of clip, Hijazi is sitting on a couch as she starts to sing. During the next few moments, there are scenes where she is browsing through a photo album and then walking through a dark alley as she sings.

"Zaman" is considered Hijazi's breakthrough single in many worldwide markets because it achieved considerable success in countries where her previous singles had not even charted. It did, for example, become a number one hit in most of the Hispanic American countries, and in some Eastern European territories like Greece, Turkey and Hungary. In addition, the song managed to become a successful but minor hit in countries like Pakistan, India, Malaysia and Singapore.

Due to its success in worldwide markets, "Zaman" reached the number position on the Lebanese and Egyptian charts. It ended the year as the most successful song of 2002.

Even today, "Zaman" is considered to be one of the greatest Arabic hits and a major milestone in Hijazi's career.

Charts

Amal Hijazi songs
2002 singles
2002 songs
Song articles with missing songwriters